1000 : Oru Note Paranja Katha (English: 1000 - Story narrated by rupee note) is a 2015 Indian Malayalam thriller film directed by A. R. C. Nair. The film features Bharath, Mukesh and Maqbool Salmaan in the lead roles along with Leema Babu and Kalaranjini in key supporting roles. The film was released worldwide on 13 February 2015.

Cast
 Bharath as Jikku Mon
 Mukesh as Jikku Mon's father
 Maqbool Salmaan as Henchman
 Biyon as Hospital attender
 Shammi Thilakan
 Kalaranjini
 Anju Aravind as Henchman's wife
 Baby Meenakshi
 Leema Babu as Hospital attender's girlfriend
 Santhosh Keezhattoor as Minister
 Santhakumari
 Kumarakom Raghunath
 Rakendu as Temple priest

Release
The Times of India gave the film a negative review stating "one joke after another falls flat and the movie becomes far from enjoyable and is at best a timid effort to entertain the audience". Likewise, a critic from Nowrunning.com noted it is "one hell of a misadventure that should keep you away from the theatres for a while, if you happen to drop in for a dekko" and that it is "ruined beyond recognition by an implausible and frightful storyline, this is film making attempting to be at its worst".

References

External links

2010s Malayalam-language films
2015 action thriller films
Indian thriller films